Charles Willis "Speed" Holman  (December 27, 1898 – May 17, 1931) was an American stunt pilot, barnstormer, wing walker, parachutist, airmail pilot, record holding aviator, and airline pilot. Born in Bloomington, Minnesota, he was the first pilot hired by Northwest Airways in 1926. In 1928, Holman set a world's record of 1,433 consecutive loops in an airplane in five hours over the St. Paul Airport.

Biography
He was born in Bloomington, Minnesota on December 27, 1898.

In 1917 Holman raced motorcycles at the Minnesota State Fair, earning the nickname "Slim", and later, "Speed". In 1918, Holman offered to work as a mechanic in exchange for flying lessons with Walter Bullock. To earn money, he quickly added parachute jumps and wingwalking to his skills. In 1924 Holman won second place in the "on to Dayton" race. In 1926 he became an airmail pilot on the CAM-9 route from Minneapolis to Chicago, along with Matty Laird. In 1927 he won the New York to Spokane cross country air derby in a Laird commercial biplane. CAM-9 was reorganized by William Bushnell Stout with several financiers to form Northwest Airlines, hiring Holman as its first pilot, later becoming its chief pilot. Holman's first pilot's license, issued in 1927, was signed by Orville Wright.

By 1929, Holman was a leading pilot for Northwest airlines, gaining more notoriety becoming the fourth person in the world to perform the outside loop, and first to do so in a commercial aircraft. Holman became a major investor in the airline, buying $2,000 worth of stock.

In 1930 Matty Laird was commissioned to build a racing plane based on the Laird Speedwing by B.F. Goodrich's Lee Schoenhair for the 1930 Thompson Trophy race. Schoenhair backed out of the project, believing the aircraft would not be tested in time. Laird entered the Laird Solution with Holman as the pilot only a few minutes after Holman flew the aircraft on its maiden flight. He won the race at average speed of 201.91 mph

Holman died in an accident during on May 17, 1931 at the opening of an airport in Omaha, Nebraska in front of 20,000 spectators, at age 32. His funeral was one of the largest yet held in St. Paul.

Legacy

Holman Field, St. Paul Downtown Airport is named in honor of Speed Holman, as was Holman street in St. Paul, Minnesota. Holman's Table, located at Holman Field, is also named in honor of the famed pilot.  Holman is also inducted in the Minnesota Aviation Hall of Fame.

References 

1898 births
1931 deaths
American aviation record holders
Aerobatic record holders
Commercial aviators
United States airmail pilots
Wing walkers
People from Minneapolis